Giacomo Medici may refer to:

 Gian Giacomo Medici (c. 1495 - 1555), Italian condottiero
 Giacomo Medici (general) (1817-1882), Italian patriot and soldier
 Giacomo Medici Del Vascello (1883–1949), Italian Fascist politician and grandson of the former
 Giacomo Medici (art dealer), Italian illicit antiquities dealer